Kionix, Inc. is a manufacturer of MEMS inertial sensors.  Headquartered in Ithaca, New York, United States, the company is a wholly owned subsidiary of ROHM Co., Ltd. of Japan. Kionix developed high-aspect-ratio silicon micromachining based on research originally conducted at Cornell University. The company offers inertial sensors, and development tools and application support to enable motion-based gaming; user-interface functionality in mobile handsets, personal navigation and TV remote controllers; and hard-disk-drive drop protection in mobile products. The company's MEMS products are also used in the automotive, industrial and health-care sectors. Kionix is ISO 9001:2008 and TS16949 registered.

History
Founded in 1993, Kionix supplies silicon microelectromechanical systems (MEMS) accelerometer products.  Kionix introduced a tri-axis accelerometer in a small form-factor package.

In November, 2009, ROHM Co., Ltd. of Japan acquired Kionix.

Products

Kionix supplies MEMS devices including tri-axis accelerometers and gyroscopes along with the mixed-signal-interface integrated circuits that provide algorithm processing of sensor data.  Its products and technologies include:
 Accelerometers with one, two, or three axes; low-g or mid-g ranges
 Angular rate sensors about the x, y, or z axis
 Power management options and self-test features
 Small form-factor, industry-standard packaging 
 Digital (I2C and SPI) interfaces and/or analog outputs
 Programmable motion interrupts, temperature compensation, gain, offset, bandwidth
 Embedded algorithms
 Lead-free solderability and RoHS compliant

Quality standards
Kionix achieved ISO registration in FY2000 and upgraded to ISO 9001:2000 in May 2003, and certified to ISO9001:2008 in April 2009.

The company achieved ISO/TS 16949 registration in July 2005 and upgraded to ISO/TS16949:2009 in April, 2011.

Manufacturing facilities
Kionix sensors are designed, manufactured, and tested at Kionix headquarters in Ithaca, NY.  The ASICs used in Kionix accelerometers are designed in Ithaca, and fabricated elsewhere in the US.  Wafers of sensor die and ASIC die are shipped from Ithaca to packaging houses in Asia, where the final product is created.  At the packaging houses, the wafers of sensor die and ASIC die are diced into individual units, fastened one each to a lead frame, and wire-bonded together.  Liquefied plastic is then squeezed into the frame and, once set, each part is cut from its construction housing.  Lastly, the company logo and part number are silk-screened onto each part.  Finished parts are returned to Ithaca for testing and programming.

Locations
Sales offices:
 Ithaca, New York
 Chicago, Illinois
 Campbell, California
 Kowloon, Hong Kong
 Shanghai, China
 Tokyo, Japan
 Seoul, South Korea
 Singapore
 Taipei City, Taiwan

Distributors:
 Mouser Electronics, United States
 Actrontek International Co., Ltd, China & Hong Kong
 STAV,  Korea
 Seraphim Engineering Co., Ltd., Taiwan  
 Willow Technologies Limited,  United Kingdom/Europe

Philanthropy
Kionix provides financial support and gifts in kind to educational and access-to-education programs in Ithaca and the surrounding communities.  Recipients include:
 IPEI Code Red Robotics
 The Museum of the Earth
 The Sciencenter
 American Red Cross

References

Ithaca, New York